The Nimule National Park is a national park in South Sudan. It was established in 1954, and extends over an area of 410 km, along the border with Uganda.

References

National parks of South Sudan
Protected areas established in 1954
Important Bird Areas of South Sudan